William Gordon Dixon (21 July 1856 – 26 January 1938) was a New Zealand cricketer. He played nine first-class matches for Otago between 1875 and 1886.

Dixon was born at Little Sutton in Cheshire in England in 1856. He worked as a bank officer. As well as cricket, he also played rugby union for Otago.

References

External links
 

1856 births
1938 deaths
New Zealand cricketers
Otago cricketers
People from Ellesmere Port